The Cruthin (or) were a people of early medieval Ireland. Their heartland was in Ulster and included parts of the present-day counties of Antrim, Down and Londonderry. They are also said to have lived in parts of Leinster and Connacht. Their name is the Irish equivalent of *Pritanī, the reconstructed native name of the Celtic Britons, and Cruthin was sometimes used to refer to the Picts, but there is a debate among scholars as to the relationship of the Cruthin with the Britons and Picts.

The Cruthin comprised several túatha (territories), which included the Dál nAraidi of County Antrim and the Uí Echach Cobo of County Down. Early sources distinguish between the Cruthin and the Ulaid, who gave their name to the over-kingdom, although the Dál nAraidi would later claim in their genealogies to be , "the true Ulaid". The Loígis, who gave their name to County Laois in Leinster, and the Sogain of Leinster and Connacht, are also claimed as Cruthin in early Irish genealogies.

By 773 AD, the annals had stopped using the term Cruthin in favour of the term Dál nAraidi, who had secured their over-kingship of the Cruthin.

Etymology

It is thought to relate to the Irish word , meaning "form, figure, shape". The name is believed to derive from *Qritani, a reconstructed Goidelic/Q-Celtic version of the Brittonic/P-Celtic *Pritani. Ancient Greek geographer Pytheas called the Celtic Britons the Pretanoí, which became Britanni in Latin.
 
It is suggested that  was not what the people called themselves, but was what their neighbours called them.

The name  survives in the placenames Duncrun ("fort of the Cruthin") and Drumcroon ("ridge of the Cruthin") in County Londonderry, and Ballycrune ("pass of the Cruthin") and Crown Mound ("ford of the Cruthin") in County Down. These placenames are believed to mark the edges of Cruthin territory.

References in the Irish annals
By the start of the historic period in Ireland in the 6th century, the over-kingdom of Ulaid was largely confined to east of the River Bann in north-eastern Ireland. The Cruthin still held territory west of the Bann in County Londonderry, and their emergence may have concealed the dominance of earlier tribal groupings.

A certain Dubsloit of the Cruthin is said to have killed the son of High King Diarmait mac Cerbaill in 555 or 558, and Diarmait himself was killed by a Cruthin over-king of Ulster, Áed Dub mac Suibni, in 565.

In 563, according to the Annals of Ulster, an apparent internal struggle amongst the Cruthin resulted in Báetán mac Cinn making a deal with the Northern Uí Néill, promising them the territories of Ard Eólairg (Magilligan peninsula) and the Lee, both west of the River Bann in County Londonderry. As a result, the battle of Móin Daire Lothair (modern-day Moneymore) was fought between them and an alliance of Cruthin kings, in which the Cruthin suffered a devastating defeat. Afterwards the Northern Uí Néill settled their Airgíalla allies in the Cruthin territory of Eilne, which lay between the River Bann and the River Bush. The defeated Cruthin alliance meanwhile consolidated itself within the Dál nAraidi dynasty.

Their most powerful historical king was Fiachnae mac Báetáin, King of Ulster and effective High King of Ireland. Under their king, Congal Cláen, they were routed by the Uí Néill at Dún Cethirnn (between Limavady and Coleraine) in 629, although Congal survived. The same year, the Cruthin king Mael Caích defeated Connad Cerr of the Dál Riata at Fid Eóin, but in 637 an alliance between Congal Cláen and Domnall Brecc of the Dál Riata was defeated, and Congal was killed, by Domnall mac Aedo of the northern Uí Néill at Mag Roth (Moira, County Down), establishing the supremacy of the Uí Neill in the north. In 681 another Dál nAraide king, Dúngal Eilni, and his allies were killed by the Uí Néill in what the annals call "the burning of the kings at Dún Cethirnn". The ethnic term "Cruthin" was by this stage giving way to the dynastic name of the Dál nAraide. The Annals record a battle between the Cruthin and the Ulaid at Belfast in 668, but the last use of the term is in 773, when the death of Flathruae mac Fiachrach, "rex Cruithne", is noted. By the twelfth century it had fallen into disuse as an ethnonym, and was remembered only as an alternative name for the Dál nAraide.

The Pictish Chronicle names the first king of the Picts as the eponymous "Cruidne filius Cinge".

Possible relationship to other groups
Early Irish writers used the name  to refer to both the north-eastern Irish group and to the Picts of Scotland. It has thus been suggested that the Cruthin and Picts were the same people or were in some way linked. Professor T. F. O'Rahilly argued that the Qritani/Pritani were "the earliest inhabitants of these islands to whom a name can be assigned".

Other scholars disagree. Historian Francis John Byrne notes that although in Irish both groups were called by the same name, in Latin they had different names, with  being reserved for the Picts. Professor Dáibhí Ó Cróinín says the "notion that the Cruthin were 'Irish Picts' and were closely connected with the Picts of Scotland is quite mistaken", while Professor Kenneth H. Jackson wrote that the Cruthin "were not Picts, had no connection with the Picts, linguistic or otherwise, and are never called  by Irish writers". There is no archaeological evidence of a Pictish link and in archaeology the Cruthin are indistinguishable from their neighbours in Ireland. The records show that the Cruthin bore Irish names, spoke Irish and followed the Irish  system of inheritance rather than the matrilineal system sometimes attributed to the Picts.

Historian Alex Woolf suggested that the Dál Riata were a part of the Cruthin, and that they were descended from the Epidii. Dál Riata was a Gaelic kingdom that included parts of western Scotland and northeastern Ireland. The Irish part of the kingdom was surrounded by Cruthin territory.

Modern politics and culture
In the 1970s, Unionist politician Ian Adamson proposed that the Cruthin were a British people who spoke a non-Celtic language and were the original inhabitants of Ulster. He argues that they were at war with the Irish Gaels for centuries, seeing the story of the Táin Bó Cúailnge as representing this; and argues that most of the Cruthin were driven to Scotland after the Battle of Moira (637), only for their descendants to return 1,000 years later in the Plantation of Ulster. Adamson's suggestion is that the Gaelic Irish are not really native to Ulster, and that the Ulster Scots have merely returned to their ancient lands. 
His theory has been adopted by some Ulster loyalists and Ulster Scots activists to counter Irish nationalism, and was promoted by elements in the Ulster Defence Association (UDA). They saw this new 'origin myth' as "a justification for their presence in Ireland and for partition of the country".

Historians, archaeologists and anthropologists have widely rejected Adamson's theory. Prof. Stephen Howe of the University of Bristol argues it was designed to provide ancient underpinnings for a militantly separate Ulster identity. Historian Peter Berresford Ellis likens it to Zionism. Archaeologists such as J. P. Mallory and T. E. McNeil note that the Cruthin are "archaeologically invisible"; there is no evidence of them being a distinct group and "there is not a single object or site that an archaeologist can declare to be distinctly Cruthin"; they further considered Adamson's claims "quite remarkable".

Much of Adamson's theories are based on the historical model put forward by Irish linguist T. F. O'Rahilly in 1946. Where Adamson differs is his claim that the Cruthin or Priteni were pre-Celtic as opposed to Celts themselves. However this model has since been refuted by authors such as Kenneth H. Jackson and John T. Koch. There is a lack of archaeological evidence for O'Rahilly's theory, and it was conclusively shown to be false in the landmark 2017 publication of the "Irish DNA Atlas", which sets out in great detail the genealogical history and modern day makeup of the British Isles.

The asteroid 3753 Cruithne was named after the group.

Robert E. Howard's pulp hero Bran Mak Morn was characterised as "chief of the Cruithni Picts".

References

Sources
Byrne, Francis J. Irish Kings and High Kings. Dublin: Four Courts Press, 2001 (2nd edition). First published in 1973.
Chadwick, Hector Munro. Early Scotland: the Picts, the Scots & the Welsh of southern Scotland. CUP Archive, 1949. Page 66–80.
 
Gallagher, Carolyn. After the Peace: Loyalist Paramilitaries in Post-Accord Northern Ireland. Cornell University, 2007
Jackson, Kenneth H. "The Pictish language." In The problem of the Picts, ed. F.T Wainwright. Edinburgh, 1956. pp. 122–166.
Maier, Bernhard. Dictionary of Celtic religion and culture. Boydell & Brewer, 1997. Page 230.
Nic Craith, Máiréad. Plural Identities, Singular Narratives: The Case of Northern Ireland, Berghahn Books, 2002
Ó Cróinín, Dáibhí. Early Medieval Ireland 400-1200, Longman, 1995
Ó Cróinín, Dáibhí. "Ireland, 400-800". In A New History of Ireland, ed. Dáibhí Ó Cróinín. Vol 1. 2005. pp. 182–234.
O'Rahilly, T.F. Early Irish History and Mythology. Dublin: Dublin Institute for Advanced Studies, 1946.
Skene, William F. Chronicles of the Picts and Scots Edinburgh, 1867.
Smyth, Alfred P. Warlords and Holy Men. Edinburgh: Edinburgh University Press, 1989.
Warner, Richard. "The Lisburn Area in the Early Christian Period Part 2: Some People and Places." Lisburn Historical Society Journals Vol 8. 1991

External links
Ulster by Dennis Walsh
The Cruithne at Electric Scotland

 
Historical Celtic peoples
Tribes of ancient Ireland
Gaelic-Irish nations and dynasties